Tad is an unincorporated community in Kanawha County, West Virginia, United States. Tad has a post office with ZIP code 25201.

An early postmaster gave the community the name of his son, Talmadge "Tad" Dunlap.

References

Unincorporated communities in Kanawha County, West Virginia
Unincorporated communities in West Virginia